The Bundara River (formerly known as the Bundara Mungee River and the Bundarah River), a perennial river of the North-East Murray catchment of the Murray-Darling basin, is located in the East Gippsland and Alpine regions of Victoria, Australia.

Location and features
The river flows generally to the east, travelling through the national park for most of its course. The Big River forms its confluences with the Cobungra River just south of this point to form the Mitta Mitta River. The river descends  over its  course.

Tributaries
Key tributaries of the Bundara River include High Plains Creek, Waterfall Creek, and Tea Tree Creek. The main tributaries flow off the southern slopes of Mount Jim, Mount Bundara and Mount Cope, and the hills to the east of the main ridge of the Australian Alps.

River health
The Bundara River and its tributaries are generally protected within the Alpine National Park. Most of the waterways in the Mitta Mitta basin are recognised as being in good to excellent condition. Extensive forest covers much of the catchment area. Despite some land clearing and livestock damage to river banks, the aquatic habitat is generally very good.

The Bundara River is noted as being particularly good for brown trout fishing. The Bundara River is part of the North East Catchment Management Authority's Victorian River Health Program, aimed at achieving healthy rivers.

In early 2003, large areas of forest around the Bundara River and its catchments were severely impacted by the massive Eastern Victorian alpine bushfires. The damage resulting from the fires impacted river health for some time after the fires.

See also

Gallery

References

External links
 

North-East catchment
Rivers of Gippsland (region)
Rivers of Hume (region)
Tributaries of the Murray River
Victorian Alps